The 1990–91 Honduran Segunda División was the 24th season of the Honduran Segunda División.  Under the management of Rubén Guifarro, Atlético Indio won the tournament after finishing first in the final round (or Hexagonal) and obtained promotion to the 1991–92 Honduran Liga Nacional.

Final round
Also known as Hexagonal.

Standings

Known results

References

Segunda
1990